Non-progressive late-onset linear hemifacial lipoatrophy is a cutaneous condition that occurs on the malar cheek, mostly in the elderly population.

See also 
 Drug-induced lipodystrophy
 List of cutaneous conditions

References 

Conditions of the subcutaneous fat